SGR 0501+4516 is a magnetar that is a soft gamma repeater (SGR).  Currently, the phenomenons of SGRs and the related Anomalous X-ray pulsars (AXP) are explained as arising from magnetars. SGR 0501+4516 is located approximately 15,000 light years from Earth and has a magnetic field 100 trillion times stronger than the Earth's.

SGR 0501+4516 is remarkable in that it has been the first SGR to have been discovered after ten years without SGR detections.
It has been suggested that SGR 0501+4516, together with 1E 1547.0-5408, should be considered as tools for a final  unification  of  SGRs,  AXPs  and  the “transient  AXPs (TAXPs)” into a single class of “magnetars candidates”.

Discovery
Its existence was reported on Aug. 22, 2008, by NASA's Swift satellite, which reported numerous blasts of radiation from the object. The eruptions were subsequently studied in-depth using the European Space Agency's XMM-Newton and International Gamma-Ray Astrophysics Laboratory (INTEGRAL) satellites. The object had been serendipitously observed before in 1992 by ROSAT.

References

Auriga (constellation)
Magnetars
Soft gamma repeaters